Augustin Gensse (born 10 August 1983) is a French professional tennis player.

Tennis career
Gensse has played two singles matches in the ATP Tour. At the Spain (Open de Tenis Comunidad Valenciana), he defeated Gorka Frailin and Alan Mackie in the qualifications. As a qualifier, he reached the second round of the tournament, winning against James Ward and losing against Iván Navarro.

He won fourteen Challenger and Futures titles, 10 singles and 4 doubles.

In 2011, he played for the first time in a Grand Slam main draw at the 2011 French Open and lost to Stanislas Wawrinka at the first round in four sets. 4–6, 6–3, 6–2, 6–4

At the 2011 US Open, Gensse qualified for the second time of the year for a Grand Slam main draw. On the first round, he lost against Janko Tipsarević in straight sets. 6–2, 7–5, 6–0

In June 2012, he injured his ankle and was forced to stop his career.
He became at the end of the year the ambassador of Decathlon and their tennis brand Artengo.

In 2015, during Roland Garros, he worked as a sparring partner. He warmed-up both finalists Novak Djokovic and Stan Wawrinka the morning of the final.

Tennis coach
In January 2013, he became the coach of the Slovakian Michaela Hončová.
Since May 2015, he's now the coach of the frenchwomen Manon Arcangioli.

Career finals

Challenger and Futures titles (10)

Runner up (3)

Doubles titles (4)

External links

 
 

1983 births
Living people
French male tennis players
People from Boulogne-sur-Mer
People from Mont-de-Marsan
Sportspeople from Pas-de-Calais
Sportspeople from Landes (department)